or bakanae disease, from the Japanese for "foolish seedling", is a disease that infects the rice plant. It is caused by the fungus Gibberella fujikuroi, the metabolism of which produces a surplus of gibberellic acid. In the plant, this acts as a growth hormone, causing hypertrophy. The affected plants, which are visibly etiolated and chlorotic, are at best infertile with empty panicles, producing no edible grains; at worst, they are incapable of supporting their own weight, topple over, and die (hence "foolish seedling disease").

The earliest known report of bakanae is from 1828; it was first described scientifically in 1898 by Japanese researcher Shotaro Hori, who showed that the causative agent was fungal.

The fungus affects rice crops in Asia, Africa, and North America. In epidemic cases yield losses may reach up to 20% or more. A 2003 publication from the International Rice Research Institute estimated that outbreaks of bakanae caused crop losses that were 20% to 50% in Japan, 15% in Thailand and 3.7% in India.

References

External links 
 The "Bakanae" Disease

Rice diseases